Claudine le Comte (born 27 February 1950) is a Belgian fencer. She competed in the women's individual foil events at the 1972 and 1976 Summer Olympics.

References

External links
 

1950 births
Living people
Belgian female foil fencers
Olympic fencers of Belgium
Fencers at the 1972 Summer Olympics
Fencers at the 1976 Summer Olympics
Sportspeople from Namur (city)